Bartosz Gawryszewski (born 22 August 1985) is a Polish volleyball player, member of the Polish club MKS Będzin.

Career

Clubs
He debuted in PlusLiga in 2004 as the AZS Częstochowa player. In his first season he won bronze medal of the Polish Championship after matches with Jastrzębski Węgiel. Then played for Jadar Radom. In 2008 he moved to Asseco Resovia Rzeszów. He achieved with this club silver (2008/2009) and bronze (2009/2010) medal of the Polish Championship. In 2010/2012 he was a player of Jastrzębski Węgiel. In 2011 Jastrzębski Węgiel, including Gawryszewski, won silver medal of the Club World Championship 2011 held in Qatar. Since 2012 he has been playing for LOTOS Trefl Gdańsk. In 2014 he was elected captain of the team by the coach Anastasi. On April 19, 2015 LOTOS Trefl Gdańsk, including Gawryszewski, achieved Polish Cup 2015. Then he won a silver medal of Polish Championship.

Sporting achievements

Clubs
 FIVB Club World Championship
  Doha 2011 – with Jastrzębski Węgiel
 National championships
 2008/2009  Polish Championship, with Asseco Resovia
 2014/2015  Polish Cup, with LOTOS Trefl Gdańsk
 2014/2015  Polish Championship, with LOTOS Trefl Gdańsk
 2015/2016  Polish SuperCup, with LOTOS Trefl Gdańsk

Youth national team
 2003  CEV U19 European Championship
 2003  European Youth Olympic Festival

References

External links
 PlusLiga player profile

1985 births
Living people
Volleyball players from Warsaw
Sportspeople from Masovian Voivodeship
Polish men's volleyball players
AZS Częstochowa players
Jadar Radom players
Resovia (volleyball) players
Jastrzębski Węgiel players
Trefl Gdańsk players
Warta Zawiercie players
MKS Będzin players